Jared Carter (born January 10, 1939) is an American poet and editor.

Life
Carter was born in a small Midwestern town that is noted for having been the birthplace of Wendell Willkie, the Republican presidential candidate in 1940. Carter grew up in the shadow of this liberal Republican dark horse who lost the election to the incumbent Roosevelt, but who supported the president in calls for preparedness while storm clouds were gathering over Europe.

Carter lettered in three sports in high school and still holds his school's record for the 400 meter dash. Following graduation in 1956, he attended Yale and, in later years, Goddard College. At Yale he majored in English literature; at Goddard, American history.

After military service and travel abroad in the 1960s, he made his home in Indianapolis, where he has lived since 1969. He worked for many years as an editor and interior designer of textbooks and scholarly works, first with the Bobbs-Merrill Company and later in association with Hackett Publishing Company.

He is a fifth-generation Hoosier, descended from anti-slavery North Carolinians and Virginians who migrated to Indiana in the decades following its establishment in 1816 as the nineteenth state. Several of his poems include details taken from the letters, journals, and family stories of his predecessors.
 
Among forebears on his mother's side was Elias Baxter Decker, of Tipton County, Indiana, who fought at Tullahoma, Chickamauga, and Missionary Ridge, and who served with the 75th Indiana Infantry Regiment in the army led by William Tecumseh Sherman, on its March to the Sea from Atlanta to Savannah and points north, in 1864-65.

During the Second World War, Carter's father, Robert A. Carter, served with the Seabees  from 1943 to 1945, and took part in the construction of airstrips for B-29s on the Island of Tinian in the Marianas.  Carter's father-in-law, David P. Haston, was a technician with a B-17 flight wing in the Pacific during that conflict, serving from 1941 to 1945.  For his participation in the Battle of Midway he was awarded three bronze stars.

On his father's side, Carter is a grand-nephew of the American artist Glen Cooper Henshaw.

Poetry
Carter writes in free verse and in traditional forms. Much of his early work is set in "Mississinewa County", an imaginary place that includes the actual Mississinewa River, a tributary of the Wabash River. In recent years, as he has published increasingly on the web, his poetry has ranged farther afield.

His poems have appeared in The New Yorker, The Nation, Poetry, and other journals in the U.S. and abroad. His work has been anthologized in Twentieth-Century American Poetry, Contemporary American Poetry,  Writing Poems, and Poetry from Paradise Valley.

His first collection, Work, for the Night Is Coming (1981), won the Walt Whitman Award. His second, After the Rain (1993), was given the Poets' Prize. He has received two literary fellowships from the National Endowment for the Arts, a Guggenheim Fellowship, and the Indiana Governor's Arts Award.

Books
 The Land Itself. Morgantown, West Virginia: Monongehela Books, 2019. 
 Darkened Rooms of Summer: New and Selected Poems.  Lincoln, Nebraska: University of Nebraska Press, 2014. 
 A Dance in the Street. Nicholasville, Kentucky: Wind Publications, 2012. 
 Cross This Bridge at a Walk. Nicholasville, Kentucky: Wind Publications, 2006. 
 Les Barricades Mystérieuses. Cleveland: Cleveland State University Poetry Center, 1999. 
 After the Rain. Cleveland: Cleveland State University Poetry Center, 1993. 
 Work, for the Night Is Coming. New York: Macmillan, 1981.

Chapbooks
 Blues Project. Indianapolis: Writers’ Center Press, 1991. 
 Situation Normal. Indianapolis: Writers’ Center Press, 1991.
 The Shriving. Tuscaloosa, Alabama: Duende Press, 1990.
 Millennial Harbinger. Philadelphia: Slash & Burn Press, 1986. 
 Pincushion's Strawberry. Cleveland: Cleveland State University Poetry Center, 1984. 
 Fugue State. Daleville, Indiana: Barnwood Press, 1984. 
 Early Warning. Daleville, Indiana: Barnwood Press, 1979.

E-books
 Time Capsule. E-book no. 26. Dayton, Washington: New Formalist Press, 2007.
 Reading the Tarot: Nine Villanelles. E-book no. 17. Dayton, Washington: New Formalist Press, 2005.

Awards
 Best Book of Poetry, Indiana Center for the Book, 2007
 Distinguished Hoosier Award, 2005
 Rainmaker Award for Poetry, Zone 3 magazine, 2002
 Poets' Prize, for After the Rain, 1994
 Dictionary of Literary Biography Yearbook Award, 1993
 New Letters Literary Award for Poetry, 1992
 Literature Fellowship, National Endowment for the Arts, 1981, 1991
 Pushcart Prize for Poetry, 1986
 Indiana Governor’s Arts Award, 1985
 Writer-in-Residence, Purdue University, 1983, 1986
 Great Lakes Colleges Association New Writers Award for Poetry, 1982
 Fellowship, John Simon Guggenheim Memorial Foundation, 1982
 Margaret Bridgman Fellowship, Bread Loaf Writers' Conference, 1981
 Walt Whitman Award, for Work, for the Night Is Coming, 1980
 Literature Fellowship, Indiana Arts Commission, 1979
 Academy of American Poets Prize, Yale University, 1961

Sources
 Deines, Timothy J."The Gleaning: Regionalism, Form, and Theme in the Poetry of Jared Carter." M.A. thesis, Cleveland State University.
 "Jared Carter." Contemporary Authors . Vol. 145, pp. 75–76. Detroit: Gale Research, 1995.
 Purdy, Gilbert Wesley. The Ties of the Railroad Tracks Home: the Poetry of Jared Carter. Kindle edition, 2014.
 Ponick, T. L., and Ponick, F. S. "Jared Carter." Dictionary of Literary Biography. Vol. 282, pp. 31–40. Detroit: Gale Research, 2003.
 Webb, Jeffrey B. "Watershed Redesign in the Upper Wabash River Drainage Area 1870-1970."   Environment, Space, Place 6:1 (spring 2016): 80-86. Zeta Books: Bucharest.

Notes

External links
 American Life in Poetry column 786
 Poems to a Listener poetry reading
 Academy of American Poets page
 Poets & Writers Directory page
 Poetry Foundation entry
 Wayback Machine capture of original Jared Carter Poetry website 2003-2007
 Goodreads entry
 Indiana Historical Society photograph
 Literary criticism, "Modulation and the Poetry of Jared Carter," at Paul Hurt's Linkagenet
 Poems at Dissident Voice
 Poems at Clementine Unbound
 Poems at Poem Hunter
 Poems at Fencerow: A Journal of the New Regionalism
 Poems at Valparaiso Poetry Review
 Poems at Peacock Journal
 Poems at Peacock Journal
 Poems at The HyperTexts
 Poems at The Scream Online
 Poems at The Scream Online
 Poems at Indiana Voice Journal
 Poems at Indiana Voice Journal
 Poems at Archipelago
 Interview at Borderless
 Interview at Better Than Starbucks
 Interview at The Hypertexts
 Interview at Valparaiso Poetry Review
 Interview at ShatterColors
 Interview at The Centrifugal Eye

20th-century American poets
21st-century American poets
American book editors
Formalist poets
Goddard College alumni
Poets from Indiana
Writers from Indianapolis
Living people
1939 births
Yale College alumni
People from Elwood, Indiana